was the 11th shōgun of the Ashikaga shogunate who reigned from 1494 to 1508 during the Muromachi period of Japan. He was the son of Ashikaga Masatomo and grandson of the sixth shōgun Ashikaga Yoshinori. His childhood name was Seikō (清晃), Yoshizumi was first called Yoshitō (sometimes translated as Yoshimichi), then Yoshitaka.

Yoshizumi was adopted by the 8th shōgun Ashikaga Yoshimasa. He was installed by Hosokawa Masamoto as Sei-i Taishōgun. He was stripped of the title in 1508 by the 10th shōgun Ashikaga Yoshitane, who became shōgun for a second period of time.

Two of Yoshizumi's sons would themselves become shōguns. Ashikaga Yoshiharu would hold nominal powers as the twelfth Muromachi shōgun; and Ashikaga Yoshihide assumed nominal powers as the fourteenth shōgun.

Family
 Father: Ashikaga Masatomo (1435–1491)
 Mother: daughter of Mushanakoji Takamitsu
 Adopted Father: Ashikaga Yoshimasa
 Adopted Mother: Hino Tomiko
 Wife: Hino Akiko
 Concubine: speculated daughter of Shiba Yoshihiro or daughter of Rokkaku Takayori
 Children:
 Ashikaga Yoshiharu by Akiko
 Ashikaga Yoshitsuna by daughter of Shiba or Rokkaku

Events of Yoshizumi's bakufu
Significant events shape the period during which Yoshizumi was shōgun:
 1494 – Hosokawa Masamoto has Yoshizumi appointed shōgun.
 1495 – Hōjō Sōun captures Odawara.
 1500 – Go-Kashiwabara succeeds.

Eras of Yoshizumi's bakufu
The years in which Yoshizumi was shogun are more specifically identified by more than one era name or nengō.
 Meiō (1492–1501)
 Bunki (1501–1504)
 Eishō (1504–1521)

Notes

References
 Ackroyd, Joyce. (1982) Lessons from History: The Tokushi Yoron. Brisbane: University of Queensland Press.  ; OCLC 7574544
 Titsingh, Isaac. (1834). Nihon Ōdai Ichiran; ou, Annales des empereurs du Japon. Paris: Royal Asiatic Society, Oriental Translation Fund of Great Britain and Ireland. OCLC 585069

1481 births
1511 deaths
15th-century shōguns
16th-century shōguns
Yoshizumi
Yoshizumi
Rinzai Buddhists